Washday at the Pa is an illustrated children's book by photographer Ans Westra, first published in 1964, that describes a day in the lives of a rural Māori family.

The book was originally published by the then School Publications Branch of the Department of Education, and printed by the Government Printer, but all 38,000 copies were withdrawn following a campaign by the Māori Women's Welfare League that it would have a 'detrimental effect' on Māori people – and that the living conditions portrayed within the book were atypical. Before it was published editors James K. Baxter and Alistair Campbell of the School Publications expressed 'doubts about the acceptability of the photographs to Māori,' but the book was published anyway. The subsequent August 1964 order by the Minister of Education caused a controversy and all copies in schools were recalled and shredded, as were all unsold copies in the Government Bookshops chain.

Westra had the book republished the next year by Caxton Press of Christchurch.

A new edition with photographs taken of the same family in 1998 was published by Ans Westra and Mark Amery in 2011.

Publications
 Washday at the Pa by Ans Westra (Caxton Press, 1964), in particular the enclosed publisher's note.
 Washday at the Pa by Ans Westra (Government Printer, 1964).
 Washday at the Pa by Ans Westra and Mark Amery (Suite Publishing, 2011)

References

New Zealand children's books
Māori history
1964 in New Zealand
Books about New Zealand
1964 children's books